The 1989 Pittsburgh Steelers season was the franchise's 57th season as a professional sports franchise and as a member of the National Football League.  They were considered a rebuilding team filled with many young players, especially after the release of longtime center Mike Webster in the offseason. The young team showed its inexperience in the first game of the season, when they lost at home to the archrival Cleveland Browns 51–0. The loss marked the Steelers worst defeat in franchise history. The following week wasn't much better, losing 41–10 to another division rival, the defending AFC Champion Cincinnati Bengals.

However, the Steelers clinched the final playoff spot in the last week in the season with a 9–7 record. Chuck Noll, in his 21st season as the team's head coach, was named the NFL's Coach of the Year for the only time in his coaching career.  

In the first round of the playoffs, the Steelers would have a memorable come-from-behind overtime victory over the division-rival Houston Oilers 26–23, which saw Gary Anderson kick a game-winning, 50-yard field goal in the extra period. The following week, the Steelers nearly pulled off a major upset against the Denver Broncos at Mile High Stadium before losing 24–23 on a Melvin Bratton one-yard touchdown run with 2:22 remaining in the game.

Though the Steelers would not make the playoffs again under Chuck Noll (missing in 1990 with an identical 9–7 record and again in 1991 at 7–9 despite a second-place finish that year), the season did set the tone for the team's return to prominence in the 1990s under his successor, Bill Cowher.

Until 2015, it was the last season the Steelers made the playoffs in a season the Super Bowl aired on CBS. Each of the next six such seasons (1991, 2000, 2003, 2006, 2009, 2012) would see the team missing the playoffs.

Staff

Roster

Offseason
The offseason was marked with the team deciding not to renew the contract of longtime center Mike Webster. Webster's release marked the end of the Super Bowl-era players on the team. Although Dwayne Woodruff was still with the Steelers and had won a Super Bowl ring during his rookie year, Webster had been the last member on the team that won all four Super Bowls. Webster would be succeeded at center with a young Dermontti Dawson, who was drafted the year before to be groomed as Webster's replacement, and like Webster would go on to an All-Pro career as one of the best at his position.

Meanwhile, the team drafted UCLA safety Carnell Lake in the second round of the 1989 draft. Lake would be a key member of the team's defense through the 1998 season, although his accomplishments would often be underlooked as opposed to his teammate, Rod Woodson.

Preseason

Schedule

Regular season

Schedule

Game summaries

Week 1 

The Steelers and Chuck Noll faced off against their divisional rival Browns and former defensive coordinator Bud Carson in the season opener.

Week 2 (Sunday September 17, 1989): at Cincinnati Bengals  

at Riverfront Stadium, Cincinnati

 Game time: 1:00 pm EDT
 Game weather:
 Game attendance: 53,885
 Referee: Dick Jorgensen
 TV announcers: (NBC) Don Criqui (play by play), Ahmad Rashad (color commentator)

Scoring drives:

 Cincinnati – FG Gallery 26
 Pittsburgh – FG Anderson 38
 Cincinnati – Brown 27 pass from Esiason (Gallery kick)
 Cincinnati – FG Gallery 47
 Cincinnati – Woods 1 run (Gallery kick)
 Pittsburgh – Hill 7 pass from Brister (Anderson kick)
 CIncinnati – Jennings 1 run (Gallery kick)
 CIncinnati – Brooks 2 run (Gallery kick)
 Cincinnati – Jennings 43 pass from Esiason (Gallery kick)

Week 3 (Sunday September 24, 1989): vs. Minnesota Vikings  

at Three Rivers Stadium, Pittsburgh, Pennsylvania

 Game time: 1:00 pm EDT
 Game weather: 54 °F (Cloudy)
 Game attendance: 50,744
 Referee: Dick Hantak
 TV announcers: (CBS) Steve Zabriskie (play by play), Hank Stram (color commentator)

Scoring drives:

 Pittsburgh – Mularkey 15 pass from Brister (Anderson kick)
 Minnesota – Wilson 1 run (Garcia kick)
 Pittsburgh – Worley 8 run (Anderson kick)
 Minnesota – Thomas 27 fumble return (Garcia kick)
 Pittsburgh – Hoge 2 run (Anderson kick)
 Pittsburgh – FG Anderson 38
 Pittsburgh – FG Anderson 44

Week 4 (Sunday October 1, 1989): at Detroit Lions  

at Pontiac Silverdome, Pontiac, Michigan

 Game time: 1:00 pm EDT
 Game weather: Dome
 Game attendance: 43,804
 Referee: Ben Dreith
 TV announcers: (NBC) Don Criqui (play by play), Ahmad Rashad (color commentator)

Scoring drives:

 Detroit – FG Murray 37
 Pittsburgh – Lipps 48 pass from Brister (Anderson kick)
 Pittsburgh – FG Anderson 20
 Pittsburgh – Carter 1 run (Anderson kick)
 Pittsburgh – Wallace 2 run (pass failed)

Week 5 (Sunday October 8, 1989): vs. Cincinnati Bengals  

at Three Rivers Stadium, Pittsburgh, Pennsylvania

 Game time: 1:00 pm EDT
 Game weather: 43 °F (Cloudy)
 Game attendance: 52,785
 Referee: Howard Roe
 TV announcers: (NBC) Joel Meyers (play by play), Paul Maguire (color commentator)

Scoring drives:

 Pittsburgh – Carter 22 pass from Brister (Anderson kick)
 Cincinnati – FG Breech 24
 Cincinnati – FG Breech 27
 Pittsburgh – FG Anderson 24
 Cincinnati – Martin 7 pass from Esiason (Breech kick)
 Pittsburgh – FG Anderson 40
 Cincinnati – Brooks 13 run (kick failed)
 Pittsburgh – FG Anderson 34
 Cincinnati – Brooks 65 run (Breech kick)

Week 6 (Sunday October 15, 1989): at Cleveland Browns  

at Cleveland Municipal Stadium, Cleveland, Ohio

 Game time: 4:00 pm EDT
 Game weather:
 Game attendance: 78,840
 Referee: Gene Barth
 TV announcers: (NBC) Joel Meyers (play by play), Paul Maguire (color commentator)

Scoring drives:

 Pittsburgh – FG Anderson 49
 Pittsburgh – Carter 14 pass from Blackledge (Anderson kick)
 Cleveland – Metcalf 2 run (Bahr kick)
 Pittsburgh – Williams 1 run (Anderson kick)

Week 7 (Sunday October 22, 1989): at Houston Oilers  

at Astrodome, Houston, Texas

 Game time: 1:00 pm EDT
 Game weather: Dome
 Game attendance: 59,091
 Referee: Jerry Markbreit
 TV announcers: (NBC) Tom Hammond (play by play), Joe Namath (color commentator)

Scoring drives:

 Houston – Highsmith 3 pass from Moon (Zendejas kick)
 Houston – FG Zendejas 41
 Houston – Duncan 51 pass from Moon (Zendejas kick)
 Houston – Highsmith 5 pass from Moon (Zendejas kick)
 Houston – FG Zendejas 51

Week 8 (Sunday October 29, 1989): vs. Kansas City Chiefs  

at Three Rivers Stadium, Pittsburgh, Pennsylvania

 Game time: 1:00 pm EST
 Game weather: 72 °F (Mostly Cloudy)
 Game attendance: 54,194
 Referee: Tom Dooley
 TV announcers: (NBC) Joel Meyers (play by play), Paul Maguire (color commentator)

Scoring drives:

 Pittsburgh – FG Anderson 41
 Pittsburgh – Lipps 16 pass from Brister (Anderson kick)
 Pittsburgh – FG Anderson 47
 Pittsburgh – FG Anderson 29
 Kansas City – FG Lowery 50
 Kansas City – Mandley 8 pass from DeBerg (Lowery kick)
 Kansas City – Maas 4 fumble return (Lowery kick)
 Pittsburgh – Lipps 64 pass from Brister (Anderson kick)

Week 9 (Sunday November 5, 1989): at Denver Broncos  

at Mile High Stadium, Denver, Colorado

 Game time: 4:00 pm EST
 Game weather:
 Game attendance: 74,739
 Referee: Red Cashion
 TV announcers: (NBC) Marv Albert (play by play), Bob Trumpy (color commentator)

Scoring drives:

 Denver – Humphrey 22 run (Treadwell kick)
 Denver – FG Treadwell 26
 Pittsburgh – Carter 15 pass from Brister (Anderson kick)
 Denver – FG Treadwell 26
 Denver – Johnson 44 pass from Elway (Treadwell kick)
 Denver – Elway 2 run (Treadwell kick)
 Denver – Humphrey 12 run (Treadwell kick)

Week 10 (Sunday November 12, 1989): vs. Chicago Bears  

at Three Rivers Stadium, Pittsburgh, Pennsylvania

 Game time: 1:00 pm EST
 Game weather: 47 °F (Partly Cloudy)
 Game attendance: 56,505
 Referee: Gordon McCarter
 TV announcers: (CBS) Jim Nantz (play by play), Pat Haden (color commentator)

Scoring drives:

 Chicago – N. Anderson 2 run (Butler kick)
 Chicago – FG Butler 39
 Chicago – Muster 20 pass from Harbaugh (Butler kick)
 Chicago – FG Butler 35

Week 11 (Sunday November 19, 1989): vs. San Diego Chargers  

at Three Rivers Stadium, Pittsburgh, Pennsylvania

 Game time: 1:00 pm EST
 Game weather: 31 °F (Cloudy)
 Game attendance: 44,203
 Referee: Bob McElwee
 TV announcers: (NBC) Joel Meyers (play by play), Paul Maguire (color commentator)

Scoring drives:

 Pittsburgh – FG Anderson 49
 San Diego – A. Miller 20 pass from McMahon (Bahr kick)
 Pittsburgh – FG Anderson 28
 San Diego – FG Bahr 27
 Pittsburgh – Woodson 84 kickoff return (Anderson kick)
 San Diego – A. Miller 18 pass from McMahon (Bahr kick)
 Pittsburgh – Hoge 1 run (Anderson kick)

Week 12 (Sunday November 26, 1989): at Miami Dolphins  

at Joe Robbie Stadium, Miami, Florida

 Game time: 1:00 pm EST
 Game weather:
 Game attendance: 59,936
 Referee: Dick Jorgensen
 TV announcers: (NBC) Marv Albert (play by play), Bob Trumpy (color commentator)

Steelers get first ever win against the Dolphins in Miami. This game was played in a driving rain storm.

Scoring drives:

 Miami – Smith 1 run (Stoyanovich kick)
 Miami – Clayton 66 pass from Marino (Stoyanovich kick)
 Pittsburgh – Hoge 1 run (Anderson kick)
 Pittsburgh – Woodruff 21 with lateral after Lake 2 fumble return (Anderson kick)
 Pittsburgh – FG Anderson 27
 Pittsburgh – Hoge 5 run (Anderson kick)
 Pittsburgh – FG Anderson 42
 Pittsburgh – Hoge 1 run (Anderson kick)

Week 13 (Sunday December 3, 1989): vs. Houston Oilers  

at Three Rivers Stadium, Pittsburgh, Pennsylvania

 Game time: 1:00 pm EST
 Game weather: 22 °F (Light Snow Showers)
 Game attendance: 40,541
 Referee: Ben Dreith
 TV announcers: (NBC) Jim Donovan (play by play), Bob Trumpy (color commentator)

Scoring drives:

 Pittsburgh – FG Anderson 18
 Pittsburgh – Hoge 4 run (Anderson kick)
 Houston – Duncan 18 pass from Moon (Zendejas kick)
 Houston – Hill 27 pass from Moon (Zendejas kick)
 Pittsburgh – FG Anderson 37
 Houston – Safety, McDowell tackled Newsome in end zone
 Pittsburgh – FG Anderson 18
 Houston – White 1 run (Zendejas kick)

Week 14 (Sunday December 10, 1989): at New York Jets  

at Giants Stadium, East Rutherford, New Jersey

 Game time: 1:00 pm EST
 Game weather:
 Game attendance: 41,037
 Referee: Johnny Grier
 TV announcers: (NBC) Tom Hammond (play by play), Joe Namath (color commentator)

Scoring drives:

 Pittsburgh – Worley 35 run (Anderson kick)
 Pittsburgh – FG Anderson 42
 Pittsburgh – FG Anderson 45

Week 15 (Sunday December 17, 1989): vs. New England Patriots  

at Three Rivers Stadium, Pittsburgh, Pennsylvania

 Game time: 1:00 pm EST
 Game weather: 5 °F (Cloudy)
 Game attendance: 26,594
 Referee: Tom Dooley
 TV announcers: (NBC) Jim Donovan (play by play), Jimmy Cefalo (color commentator)

Scoring drives:

 Pittsburgh – Worley 8 run (Anderson kick)
 New England – FG Staurovsky 20
 Pittsburgh – Hoge 1 run (Anderson kick)
 Pittsburgh – Lipps 58 run (Anderson kick)
 Pittsburgh – Hoge 2 run (Anderson kick)
 New England – C. Jones 12 pass from Wilson (Staurovsky kick)

Week 16 (Sunday December 24, 1989): at Tampa Bay Buccaneers  

 Game time: 1:00 pm EST
 Game weather:
 Game attendance: 29,690
 Referee: Jerry Seeman
 TV announcers: (NBC) Joel Meyers (play by play), Paul Maguire (color commentator)

Scoring drives:

 Pittsburgh – Worley 1 run (Anderson kick)
 Tampa Bay – Carrier 7 pass from Ferguson (Igwebuike kick)
 Pittsburgh – Lipps 79 pass from Brister (Anderson kick)
 Tampa Bay – FG Igwebuike 45
 Pittsburgh – Lipps 12 pass from Brister (Anderson kick)
 Pittsburgh – FG Anderson 32
 Tampa Bay – FG Igwebuike 24
 Pittsburgh – Worley 1 run (Anderson kick)
 Tampa Bay – Safety Cocroft blocked punt out of end zone
 Tampa Bay – Carrier 39 pass from Ferguson (Igwebuike kick)

Standings

Playoffs

Game summaries

AFC Wild Card Playoff (Sunday December 31, 1989): at Houston Oilers  

at Astrodome, Houston, Texas

 Game time: 4:00 pm EST
 Game weather: Dome
 Game attendance: 58,306
 Referee: Pat Haggerty
 TV announcers: (NBC) Marv Albert (play by play), Bob Trumpy (color commentator)

Scoring drives:

 Pittsburgh – Worley 9 run (Anderson kick)
 Houston – FG Zendejas 26
 Houston – FG Zendejas 35
 Pittsburgh – FG Anderson 25
 Houston – FG Zendejas 26
 Pittsburgh – FG Anderson 30
 Pittsburgh – FG Anderson 48
 Houston – Givins 18 pass from Moon (Zendejas kick)
 Houston – Givins 9 pass from Moon (Zendejas kick)
 Pittsburgh – Hoge 2 run (Anderson kick)
 Pittsburgh – FG Anderson 50

AFC Divisional Playoff (Sunday January 7, 1990): at Denver Broncos  

at Mile High Stadium, Denver, Colorado

 Game time: 4:00 pm EST
 Game weather:
 Game attendance: 75,868
 Referee: Gene Barth
 TV announcers: (NBC) Dick Enberg (play by play), Bill Walsh (color commentator)

Scoring drives:

 Pittsburgh – FG Anderson 32
 Pittsburgh – Hoge 7 run (Anderson kick)
 Denver – Bratton 1 run (Treadwell kick)
 Pittsburgh – Lipps 9 pass from Brister (Anderson kick)
 Denver – FG Treadwell 43
 Denver – Johnson 37 pass from Elway (Treadwell kick)
 Pittsburgh – FG Anderson 35
 Pittsburgh – FG Anderson 32
 Denver – Bratton 1 run (Treadwell kick)

Awards and honors
 Tunch Ilkin, AFC Pro Bowl
 Carnell Lake, Steelers Rookie of the Year
 Rod Woodson, AFC Pro Bowl

References

External links
 1989 Pittsburgh Steelers season at Profootballreference.com 
 1989 Pittsburgh Steelers season statistics at jt-sw.com 

Pittsburgh Steelers seasons
Pittsburgh Steelers
Pitts